Wind from the Icy Country is a 1964 Australian television play directed by Patrick Barton and starring Norman Kaye.

Premise
A German engineer, Ehrbar, who worked in China during the war encounters a Jewish doctor in an isolated Chinese mountain village in Paoshan, in the northwest. Ehrbar breaks down in a car with his companion, Ella, who is fleeing an unhappy marriage.

Cast
Brian James as Rachmann
Norman Kaye as Ehrbar
Patsy King as Ella
Kurt Ludescher as Captain Kang
Neil Curnow as lt Mah
Dawn Klinberg
Roly Barlee
Ray Angel
Joseph Szabo
Douglas Kelly
Clen Farmer
Blaise Anthony

Production
Robert Amos adapted his radio play. Amos described the story as a drama on conscience in the style of Kafka.

Reception
The TV critic for The Sydney Morning Herald thought that it proved that "when a play is completely focused on the working out of intense human conflicts at close range, television proves to be an excellent medium... Brian James made the doctor into a tragic and moving figure consumed by the torture of past experience."

References

External links
Wind from the Icy Country at IMDb
Wind from the Icy Country at National Film and Sound Archive

Australian television films
1964 television plays